Hypotia proximalis is a species of snout moth in the genus Hypotia. It was described by Hugo Theodor Christoph in 1882 and is known from Azerbaijan and Pakistan.

References

Moths described in 1882
Hypotiini